Roger Laurence Blackman (24 July 1941 – 17 March 2022) was a British entomologist and former President of the Royal Entomological Society (1999–2000). He is particularly known for work on the evolutionary biology and ecology of Hemiptera.

References

Fellows of the Royal Entomological Society
Presidents of the Royal Entomological Society
British entomologists
Living people
1941 births
Place of birth missing (living people)
Date of birth missing (living people)